David Abrahams may refer to:

 David Abrahams (businessman) (born 1944), British businessman and part of the Labour party proxy and undeclared donations (2007) scandal
 David Abrahams (computer programmer), best known for his activities related to the C++ and Swift programming languages
 David Abrahams (mathematician) (born 1958), English mathematician at the University of Manchester
 David Abrahams (swimmer) (born 2001) American Paralympic swimmer

See also
David Abraham (disambiguation)